Phenacovolva recurva is a species of medium-sized sea snail, a marine gastropod mollusc in the family Ovulidae.

This species is found in the western Pacific from Japan to northern New Zealand.

References

Further reading 
 Powell A. W. B., New Zealand Mollusca, William Collins Publishers Ltd, Auckland, New Zealand 1979 

Ovulidae
Gastropods described in 1848
Molluscs of the Pacific Ocean